Ioannis Ikonomou (born 1964) is a Greek translator who has been working for the European Commission in Brussels since 2002. Considered a notable contemporary example of a polyglot, he knows 32 living languages including Greek, English, German, Italian, Spanish, French, Finnish, Danish, Russian, Swahili, Hebrew, Arabic, Mandarin and Bengali, and reportedly as many as 47 languages including dead languages like Old Church Slavic.  He speaks 21 out of 24 official EU languages. He considers the Mandarin language as the most complicated language to learn. Chinese is also his favorite language. He is the only in-house translator of the European Commission who is trusted to translate classified Chinese documents.

Education 
Inspired by foreign tourists visiting Crete, he began to study foreign languages at a young age: English at age five, when he moved to Athens with his family, German at seven, Italian at 10, Russian at 13, East African Swahili at 14, and Turkish at 16. He had learned 15 languages by the age of 20.
He studied linguistics at the University of Thessaloniki before pursuing an MA in Middle Eastern languages and cultures at Columbia University in the United States. He continued with a PhD in Indo-European linguistics at Harvard University. The subject of his dissertation in Harvard was a text by  Zarathustra written in Avestan, a form of Old Iranian.

Personal life 
He identifies as gay, and married to Tomek, who is Polish. To maintain his language skills, he chats online with native speakers from around the world. His  favorite hobby is reading Chinese books and taking notes.

See also
List of polyglots

References

1964 births
20th-century translators
21st-century translators
Aristotle University of Thessaloniki alumni
European Commission
Greek gay men
Greek translators
Harvard Graduate School of Arts and Sciences alumni
20th-century Greek LGBT people
21st-century Greek LGBT people
Living people
People from Heraklion